Jaan Kirsipuu (born 17 July 1969 in Tartu) is an Estonian former road bicycle racer, who currently works as a directeur sportif for UCI Continental team .

He spent the majority of his career riding under the management of Vincent Lavenu, initially joining Lavenu's  team as a stagiaire and staying with the squad in its various incarnations for 12 years, taking a total of 124 race wins for the team. Kirsipuu initially retired at the end of the 2006, but participated in the 2007 Estonian championship, becoming time trial champion for the sixth time. In 2008 he was the manager of Latvian UCI Continental cycling team . In 2009 he joined . During his career, Kirsipuu got 115 professional wins and another 62 wins from criteriums and other non-professional races. He retired again in 2012, and became a sporting director with the  team.

At his peak he was one of Estonia's top athletes and the first Estonian rider to win a stage in the Tour de France. He dropped out of the Tour de France 12 times, which is the record. In spite of this, he won multiple stages and wore the yellow jersey for six days in 1999. This made him the only rider from Estonia to lead any of the three Grand Tours until Rein Taaramäe led the Vuelta for two days in 2021.

Major results

1988
 1st  Road race, National Road Championships
1990
 6th Overall Tour of Sweden
1st Stage 6
1992
 1st Tro-Bro Léon
 1st Stage 1 Paris–Bourges
 3rd La Côte Picarde
1993
 1st Grand Prix d'Isbergues
 Quatre Jours de l'Aisne
1st Stages 1a, 1b & 5
 1st Stage 4 4 Jours de Dunkerque
 1st Stage 4 Tour de l'Avenir
 3rd Grand Prix de Plumelec-Morbihan
1994
 Quatre Jours de l'Aisne
1st Stages 2 & 5
 1st Stage 4 Tour d'Armorique
 1st Stage 4 Tour du Poitou Charentes et de la Vienne
 3rd La Côte Picarde
1995
 Tour du Poitou Charentes et de la Vienne
1st Stages 2 & 3
 1st Stage 4a Quatre Jours de l'Aisne
 2nd Grand Prix de Plumelec-Morbihan
1996
 2nd Grand Prix de Plumelec-Morbihan
 6th Grand Prix de Rennes
1997
 1st Tour de Vendée
 1st GP de Cholet-Pays-de-Loire
 Tour du Poitou Charentes et de la Vienne
1st Stages 1 & 2
 Tour de Pologne
1st Stage 3 & 4
 1st Stage 5 Tour de Luxembourg
 1st Stage 1 Giro di Puglia
 2nd Classic Haribo
 6th Omloop van het Waasland
 6th Scheldeprijs
 7th Omloop Het Volk
 7th Grand Prix de Denain
1998
 National Road Championships
1st  Time trial
1st  Road race
 1st GP de Cholet-Pays-de-Loire
 1st Route Adélie
 1st Grand Prix de Villers-Cotterêts
 1st GP de Denain Porte du Hainaut
 1st Stage 3 Vuelta a España
 1st Stage 5 Étoile de Bessèges
 1st Stage 1 4 Jours de Dunkerque
 1st Stage 3 Route du Sud
 1st Stage 2 Tour du Poitou Charentes et de la Vienne
 3rd Overall Circuit Cycliste Sarthe
1st Stages 1, 3 & 5
 3rd Overall Giro di Puglia
1st Stages 1 & 3
 3rd Tour de Vendée
 3rd Paris–Tours
 4th Kuurne-Brussels-Kuurne
 8th Overall Tour de Picardie
1999
 National Road Championships
1st  Time trial
1st  Road race
 1st Coupe de France de cyclisme sur route
 1st  Overall Tour de Picardie
1st Stage 2b
 1st GP de Cholet-Pays-de-Loire
 1st Tour de Vendée
 1st Tour de l'Oise
 Étoile de Bessèges
1st Stages 4 & 5
 4 Jours de Dunkerque
1st Stages 6 & 7
 Tour de France
1st Stage 1
Held  after Stage 2–7
Held  after Stage 1–8
 1st Stage 2 Paris–Nice
 1st Stage 2 Tour Méditerranéen
 1st Stage 3 Tour de Luxembourg
 1st Stage 1b Tour of Sweden
 1st Stage 5 Tour du Poitou Charentes et de la Vienne
 1st Stage 3 Tour de Pologne
 1st Stage 3 Giro della Provincia di Lucca
 2nd GP de Denain Porte du Hainaut
 3rd Paris–Tours
 10th Route Adélie
2000
 1st Classic Haribo
 1st Tour de Vendée
 Tour de Pologne
1st Stages 2, 3 & 4
 1st Stage 1 Paris–Nice
 1st Stage 5a Setmana Catalana de Ciclisme
 1st Stage 7 4 Jours de Dunkerque
 1st Stage 5 Danmark Rundt
 National Road Championships
2nd Time trial
2nd Road race
 2nd Overall Étoile de Bessèges
1st Stages 1, 3 & 6
 3rd Kuurne–Brussels–Kuurne
 8th Boucles de l'Aulne
 9th Omloop Het Volk
 9th GP de Denain Porte du Hainaut
 9th Paris–Tours
2001
 National Road Championships
1st  Time trial
2nd Road race
 1st Route Adélie
 1st Grand Prix de Denain
 1st Tartu Tänavasõit
 1st Sadamast Sadamasse (Tallinn-Paldiski)
 1st Stage 6 Tour de France
 Tour Méditerranéen
1st  Points classification
1st Stages 5 & 6
 Circuit Cycliste de la Sarthe
1st Stages 2 & 3
 1st Stage 2 Tour de Picardie
 1st Stage 2 Tour de Luxembourg
 1st Stage 2 Tour du Poitou Charentes et de la Vienne
 1st Stage 1 Tour de Pologne
 1st Stage 1 Giro della Provincia di Lucca
 2nd Overall Danmark Rundt
1st Stage 6
 2nd Gran Premio Bruno Beghelli
 4th Dwars door Vlaanderen
 6th Overall 4 Jours de Dunkerque
1st Stages 1, 2, 4 & 7
 6th Paris–Brussels
 7th Tour de Vendée
 8th Kuurne–Brussels–Kuurne
 8th Cholet-Pays de Loire
 8th Paris–Tours
2002
 National Road Championships
1st  Time trial
1st  Road race
 1st Kuurne–Brussels–Kuurne
 1st Classic Haribo
 1st Tartu Tänavasõit
 1st Stage 5 Tour de France
 Étoile de Bessèges
1st Stages 4 & 5
 6th Overall Danmark Rundt
 7th Road race, UCI Road World Championships
2003
 1st  Time trial, National Road Championships
 1st Coupe de France de cyclisme sur route
 1st Gran Premio della Costa Etruschi
 1st Classic Haribo
 1st Tour de Vendée
 1st GP Ühispanga Tartu
 1st  Overall Driedaagse van West-Vlaanderen
1st Stage 2
 1st Stage 5 Étoile de Bessèges
 1st Stage 3 4 Jours de Dunkerque
 1st Stage 6 Danmark Rundt
 1st Stage 3 Tour du Poitou Charentes et de la Vienne
 2nd Scheldeprijs
 6th Dwars door Vlaanderen
 7th Cholet-Pays de Loire
 7th E3 Prijs Vlaanderen
 10th GP de la Ville de Rennes
2004
 1st  Time trial, National Road Championships
 1st Stage 1 Tour de France
 Étoile de Bessèges
1st Stage 2 & 5
 1st Stage 4 Tour de la Région Wallonne
 2nd Overall Driedaagse van West-Vlaanderen
1st  Points classification
1st Stages 1 & 2
 2nd Dwars door Vlaanderen
 2nd E3 Prijs Vlaanderen
 2nd Tour de Vendée
 3rd Gent–Wevelgem
 5th Tallinn–Tartu GP
 6th Overall Tour de Picardie
 9th Paris–Tours
2005
 National Road Championships
1st  Time trial
1st  Road race
 1st Stage 3 Tour de Pologne
 1st Stage 3 Tour du Poitou Charentes et de la Vienne
 7th Paris–Bourges
 9th Châteauroux Classic
2006
 1st  Time trial, National Road Championships
 Étoile de Bessèges
1st Stages 2 & 5
 8th Classic Haribo
2007
 National Road Championships
1st  Time trial
2nd Road race
 6th Tartu GP
 7th Tallinn–Tartu GP
2008
 1st  Road race, National Road Championships
 4th Riga GP
 7th Tallinn–Tartu GP
2009
 FDB Insurance Ras
1st Stages 3 & 8
 Tour de Hokkaido
1st Stages 3 & 4
 1st Stage 9 Tour du Cameroun
 1st Stage 2 Herald Sun Tour
 2nd Tallinn–Tartu GP
 4th Time trial, National Road Championships
 9th Overall Tour du Maroc
1st Stage 7
2010
 2nd Tallinn–Tartu GP
 3rd Road race, National Road Championships
 6th Mumbai Cyclothon
 8th Vice President Cup
2011
 1st Jūrmala GP
 1st Stage 4 Tour de Korea
 4th Tallinn–Tartu GP
 7th Tour de Mumbai I
2012
 6th Jūrmala GP

References

External links

1969 births
Living people
Sportspeople from Tartu
Estonian male cyclists
Olympic cyclists of Estonia
Estonian Tour de France stage winners
Cyclists at the 1996 Summer Olympics
Cyclists at the 2004 Summer Olympics
Miina Härma Gymnasium alumni